This is a list of episodes for the animated television series Scooby-Doo! Mystery Incorporated, the eleventh incarnation of Hanna-Barbera's Scooby-Doo series of Saturday morning cartoons. The series is produced by Warner Bros. Animation. Unlike any previous series, Scooby-Doo! Mystery Incorporated features an overarching story. In addition to the traditional cases they always solve, the team finds itself being nudged into the uncovering of a dark secret that is hidden in the past of Crystal Cove, covered up by parties unknown. Following cryptic hints from a faceless mystery-man known only as "Mr. E" (a play on "mystery"), they find themselves caught up in the unsolved, decades-old case of the disappearance of four mystery-solving youths and their pet — the original Mystery Incorporated.

Series overview

Episodes

Season 1 (2010–11)
Reference for airdates:

Season 2 (2012–13)
Reference for airdates:

References 

Lists of Scooby-Doo television series episodes
Lists of American children's animated television series episodes